BY Draconis is a multiple star system in the constellation Draco, consisting of at least three components. Components A and B are main sequence stars, and form a close binary star system with a short orbital period of only 5.98 days. Their individual spectroscopic classifications are dK5e and dK7e. They form the prototype of a class of variable stars known as BY Draconis variables.

The third component (C) is, by comparison, widely separated from the A-B pair by an angular distance of 17 arcseconds, which corresponds to  260 AU at the estimated distance of this star system—where an AU is the average distance from the Earth to the Sun. Component C is an M5 class red dwarf star. There may be a fourth component to the system, orbiting with a ≤1000‑day period, responsible for the eccentricity of the 5.98-day orbit, but this has not been visually confirmed.

The variability of BY Draconis is caused by activity in the stellar photosphere called starspots, which are comparable to sunspots on the Sun, in combination with rapid rotation that changes the viewing angle of the activity relative to the observer. This variation has an average periodicity of 3.8285 days, but the brightness also changes over the course of several years—depending on the level of surface activity. Most observers believe that the primary star (A) is responsible for the variability as the secondary produces only a third of the total luminosity from the system. However, the spots may occur on both stars. Unlike the Sun, these spots may occur in the polar regions of the stars.

References

External links
 

Draco (constellation)
BY Draconis variables
K-type main-sequence stars
Draconis, BY
234667
0719
Durchmusterung objects
091009
Flare stars
TIC objects
Triple star systems
Emission-line stars